Ballyhackamore is a townland in County Down, Northern Ireland, it is a suburb of Belfast located on the Upper Newtownards Road. It is also a ward in the UK Parliamentary constituency of East Belfast.

The Sunday Times named Ballyhackamore the Brunch Capital of Belfast in a 2018 article on the Best Places to live in Britain. The neighbourhood is the location of several restaurants and cafés as well as a range of local and national shops.

Transport
Ballyhackamore is served by the Translink Glider G1 service. In addition Metro and Ulsterbus services stop here.

Places of note

Cyprus Avenue a residential street and conservation area which lent its name to the Van Morrison song, Cyprus Avenue
Neill's Hill railway station a former halt on the Belfast and County Down Railway line.
Kincora Boys' Home, a home for boys that was the scene of serious organised abuse.
Bloomfield Collegiate School, an Independent Grammar School for girls.

Notable people
Joe Bratty, loyalist paramilitary, lived in Ballyhackamore at the time of his death
Judith Cochrane, politician, had a constituency office in Ballyhackamore
Ian Geddes Davidson, Irish rugby union player, born in Ballyhackamore
Gemma Garrett, former Miss Great Britain, attended Bloomfield Collegiate
Christine Lampard, TV broadcaster, attended Bloomfield Collegiate
Joan Lingard, Scottish novelist, grew up and lived in Ballyhackamore until the age of 18
Naomi Long, leader of the Alliance Party of Northern Ireland, attended Bloomfield Collegiate and lives in Ballyhackamore
Paddy O'Flaherty, broadcaster and journalist
Elaine Shemilt, fine art printmaker, attended Bloomfield Collegiate

In popular culture
Ballyhackamore – "Town of the big horses”, an NVTV television programme
Cyprus Avenue, a Van Morrison song

References

Townlands of County Down
Electoral wards of Belfast
Districts of Belfast